The first round of CONCACAF matches for 2022 FIFA World Cup qualification was played in March and June 2021.

Format
A total of 30 teams (CONCACAF teams ranked 6 to 35 based on the FIFA rankings of July 2020) were divided into six groups of five teams each. In each group, teams played against each other once in a single round-robin format, for a total of four matches per team (two home and two away). The top team of each of the six groups advanced to the second round.

Seeding
The draw for the first round was held, along with the draw for the third round, on 19 August 2020, 19:00 CEST (UTC+2), at the FIFA headquarters in Zürich, Switzerland.

The seeding was based on the FIFA World Rankings of July 2020 (shown in parentheses). Teams in Pot 1 were pre-seeded to positions A1 to F1 based on their ranking (A1 as the highest-ranked team in Pot 1, and F1 as the lowest-ranked in Pot 1). The remaining teams were drawn by pot into the first available group alphabetically. Each team was assigned the position in their group based on their pot number (Pot 2 was placed in position 2, Pot 3 was placed in position 3).

Note: Bolded teams qualified for the second round.

Schedule
The matches were originally scheduled for 7–13 October and 11–17 November 2020. However, CONCACAF announced on 8 September 2020 that the matches would be postponed, and would not begin until March 2021. The schedule for the March 2021 matches was announced on 26 February 2021. Due to the COVID-19 pandemic in North America and related quarantine and travel restrictions in certain countries, some matches took place at neutral venues.

Groups

Group A

Group B

Group C

Group D

Group E

Saint Lucia withdrew before playing.

Group F

Goalscorers

Notes

References

External links

Qualifiers – North, Central America and Caribbean: Matches, FIFA.com
World Cup Qualifying – Men, CONCACAF.com

1
Qual1
FIFA World Cup qualification - CONCACAF First Round
FIFA World Cup qualification - CONCACAF First Round
FIFA World Cup qualification - CONCACAF First Round, 2022
Canada at the 2022 FIFA World Cup